The Nasrid dynasty ( banū Naṣr or banū al-Aḥmar; Spanish: Nazarí) was the last Muslim dynasty in the Iberian Peninsula, ruling the Emirate of Granada from 1230 until 1492. Its members claimed to be of Arab origin. Twenty-three emirs ruled Granada from the founding of the dynasty in 1230 by Muhammad I until 2 January 1492, when Muhammad XII surrendered all lands to Queen Isabella I of Castile. Today, the most visible evidence of the Nasrid dynasty is part of the Alhambra palace complex built under their rule.

Background 
The dynasty founded by Muhammad I of Granada held a territory that included Granada, Jaén, Almería, and Málaga. Valencia, Játiva, and Jaén were conquered by Christians during the campaigns of the Reconquista and for the most part, the Nasrids were made into tribute-paying vassals from 1243. Granada continued as a center of Islamic culture. The Nasrids later formed alliances with the Marinids of Morocco.

Nasrid crafts like textile work such as ceramic overglaze used techniques from 9th century Baghdad and were applied to make lusterware, first in Málaga, Murcia, and Almería, and then by the 15th century in Manises. This style of pottery produced first under Muslim patronage, then Christian, influenced the later style of colorful and glazed Italian ceramics known as maiolica. Throughout the 14th century, the Nasrids are noted for their palace architecture like the Alhambra, which was a product of the efforts of Ismail I and Muhammad V.

In 1469, Ferdinand II of Aragon married Isabella I of Castile, uniting the Christian Kingdoms of Castile and Aragon in a common cause dedicated to purging Islam from the Iberian Peninsula. The last Nasrid ruler Muhammad XII of the Emirate of Granada was exiled to Fez (Morocco) in 1492 and the remaining Muslim population was given the status of mudéjar.

Lineage 
The Nasrid dynasty claimed to be descended from the Arab Banu Khazraj tribe, and of direct male-line descent from Sa'd ibn Ubadah, the chief of the tribe and one of the companions of the Islamic prophet Muhammad. The nasab of Yusuf (nicknamed "al-Ahmar", meaning "the Red").

Conflicts of succession and civil war 
During the time the Christians were launching a campaign against the Emirate of Granada that would effectively end the Nasrid dynasty, the Nasrids were engaged in a civil war over the throne of Granada. When Abu l-Hasan Ali, Sultan of Granada, was ousted by his son Muhammad XII, Abu l-Hasan Ali retreated to Málaga and civil war broke out between the competing factions. Christians took full advantage of this and continued capturing Muslim strongholds. Muhammed XII was caught by Christian forces in 1483 at Lucena, Córdoba. He was freed after he swore an oath of allegiance to Ferdinand II of Aragon and Isabella I of Castile. Abu l-Hasan Ali finally abdicated in favor of his brother Muhammad XIII, Sultan of Granada, known as Al-Zaghal (the valiant), and a power struggle with Muhammad XII continued. Al-Zaghal prevailed in the inner struggle but was forced to surrender to the Christians. Muhammad XII was given a lordship in the Alpujarras mountains, but instead took financial compensation from the Spanish crown to leave the Iberian Peninsula.

Legacy 
The Nasrid dynasty was one of the longest ruling Muslim dynasties in the Iberian Peninsula, reigning for more than 250 years from the establishment of the Emirate of Granada in 1230 to its annexation in 1492. The Nasrids constructed the Alhambra palace-fortress complex in Granada.

Family tree 

The family tree below shows the genealogical relationship between each sultan of the Nasrid dynasty. It starts with their common ancestor, Yusuf al-Ahmar. Daughters are omitted, as are sons whose descendants never reigned. During times of rival claims to the throne, the family tree generally recognizes the sultan who controlled the city of Granada itself and the Alhambra palace.

List of Nasrid sultans of Granada

First dynasty (al-dawla al-ghalibiyya) 
Sources::

Second dynasty (al-dawla al-isma'iliyya al-nasriyya) 
Sources::

See also 
 Al-Andalus
 Alhambra
 Romance of Abenámar
 Taifa of Granada

Citations

General and cited references

External links 

 
Alhambra (Spain)
Arab dynasties
Emirate of Granada
Granada